Greenogue Business Park is a business park near Rathcoole, County Dublin. It is 1.1km from the Rathcoole interchange on the N7 Road, which is itself 8.5km from the N7/M50 interchange (Junction 9) at the Red Cow interchange.

Major Companies
Amazon Logistics leased an e-commerce warehouse in 2020.

Public transport
The number 68 bus travels between Hawkins street in Dublin City centre and the business park. The number 69 travels between Hawkins street and nearby Rathcoole.

History
Gintaras Zelvys was shot dead at his business in the estate in 2013.

Declan Brady was arrested when illegally held arms were found in his unit at the park in 2017.

References

External links
Greenogue & Aerodrome Business Parks home page

Business parks of Ireland